Lionel Haven (born 30 December 1965) is a former football executive and retired association football player from the Bahamas.

International career
Haven played for the Bahamas in Pan-American Games Qualifiers in 1987 against Mexico and in all 4 FIFA World Cup qualification matches in 2000.

Administration
After retiring as a player, Haven was long-time head coach of Cavalier FC and served as Executive Director and General Secretary of the Bahamas Football Association and also became a member of the Executive Committee of the Caribbean Football Union in 2001.

FIFA Ban
In April 2016, Haven was banned for five years by FIFA Ethics Committee from all football-related activities due to non-disclosure of information around payments at a CFU event. The verdict was a fine of $3,000. Haven's ban was due to an alleged cash for votes controversy.  It happened at a hotel in Trinidad, where the Caribbean football executives were given $40,000 in envelopes ahead of the 2011 FIFA presidential election. He later denied any wrongdoing.

Personal life
Haven graduated from the University of Charleston, West Virginia in 1989. He then worked as an accountant and is currently CEO at a land title research company.

His older brother Sam also played for the national team and was a president of the BFA. He died in August 2014.
Two of his daughters played for the Bahamas Women U-17 team in 2012.

References

External links
 

1965 births
Living people
Association football defenders
Bahamian footballers
Bahamas international footballers